Michigan Park is a neighborhood in Ward 5 of Northeast Washington, D.C. in the Upper Northeast area element. The boundaries of Michigan Park and North Michigan Park neighborhoods are contested due to the history of racial disparity between the two, but in general Michigan Park is considered to be contained between South Dakota Avenue to the west, Eastern Avenue to the east, Galloway Street NE to the north and Taylor Street NE to the South. Both neighborhoods are in DC Neighborhood Cluster 20 along with the University Heights neighborhood.  Michigan Park is home to two established Civic Associations: the North Michigan Park Civic Association which has its established boundaries that include both Michigan Park and North Michigan Park and the Queens Chapel Civic Association (that is separate from the Queens Chapel neighborhood which borders Michigan Park to the north). The Queens Chapel association meets regularly at Union Wesley African Methodist Zion Church and its boundaries are between 16th Street NE and Webster Street NE to the north, Michigan Avenue NE to the south, and South Dakota Avenue NE to the west. 

Michigan Park is easily accessible by Fort Totten and Brookland-CUA Metro Stations on the Washington Metropolitan Area Red Line. 

Michigan Park also has Barnard Hill, a Fort Circle Park named for Major General John G. Barnard, that has excellent views of Upper Northeast.

References

Neighborhoods in Northeast (Washington, D.C.)